Stolen Sweets is an album by saxophonist Houston Person recorded in 1976 and released on the Muse label.

Reception
Allmusic awarded the album 4½ stars calling it "First-rate soul jazz, funk, blues, and ballads".

Track listing 
 "If Ever I Would Leave You" (Alan Jay Lerner, Frederick Loewe) – 10:38  
 "At Last" (Mack Gordon, Harry Warren) – 7:42  
 "Stolen Sweets" (Wild Bill Davis) – 5:35  
 "Skylark" (Johnny Mercer, Hoagy Carmichael) – 7:32  
 "T-Bone Steak" (Jimmy Smith) – 6:32

Personnel 
Houston Person – tenor saxophone 
Jimmy Ponder – guitar
Sonny Phillips – organ
Frankie Jones – drums
Buddy Caldwell – congas

References 

Houston Person albums
1977 albums
Muse Records albums